Quinciano is a village in Tuscany, central Italy, administratively a frazione of the comune of Monteroni d'Arbia, province of Siena. At the time of the 2001 census its population was 17.

Quinciano is about 20 km from Siena and 5 km from Monteroni d'Arbia.

References 

Frazioni of Monteroni d'Arbia